Northern Thailand, or more specifically Lanna, is geographically characterised by several mountain ranges, which continue from the Shan Hills in bordering Myanmar to Laos, and the river valleys which cut through them. Though like most of Thailand, it has a tropical savanna climate, its relatively high elevation and latitude contribute to more pronounced seasonal temperature variation, with cooler winters than the other regions. Historically it is related to the Lanna Kingdom and its culture.

Geography

North Thailand is bound by the Salween River in the west and the Mekong in the east. The basins of rivers Ping, Wang, Yom, and Nan, all tributaries of the Chao Phraya River, in the central part run from north to south and are mostly very wide. The basins cut across the mountains of two great ranges, the Thanon Range in the western part and the Phi Pan Nam in the eastern. Their elevations are generally moderate, a little above  for the highest summits. Although formerly forested, many of these mountains are now denuded.

Parallel mountain ranges extend from the Daen Lao Range (ทิวเขาแดนลาว), in the southern region of the Shan Hills, in a north–south direction, the Dawna Range (ทิวเขาดอยมอนกุจู) forming the western border of Thailand between Mae Hong Son and the Salween River. To the east the Thanon Thong Chai Range (เทือกเขาถนนธงชัย), the Khun Tan Range (ทิวเขาขุนตาน), the Phi Pan Nam Range (ทิวเขาผีปันน้ำ), as well as the western part of the Luang Prabang Range (ทิวเขาหลวงพระบาง), form the natural region of the Thai highlands together with the former.

These high mountains are incised by steep river valleys and upland areas that border the central plain. A series of rivers, including the Nan, Ping, Wang, Yom, and Nan, flow southwards through mountain valleys and join to form the Chao Phraya in Nakhon Sawan Province in the central region. Sirikit Dam is on the Nan River in Uttaradit Province. The northeastern part is drained by rivers flowing into the Mekong basin, like the Kok and Ing.

The four-region system includes the northern parts of the central plain as well as some mountainous areas bordering the western and the northeastern limits.

National parks

Within the northern region there are some sixty national parks. Chiang Mai Province has nine national parks of which Doi Inthanon National Park with the country's highest mountain and Op Luang National Park have a scenic river canyon, waterfalls, and caves. Doi Phu Kha National Park in province Nan is northern Thailand's largest national park.

Regional classification of northern Thailand 
The northern region, as defined by the National Geographical Committee in 1978, consists of nine provinces. Geographically the division, in conformance with the six-region system, includes most of the mountainous natural region of the Thai highlands.

In the four-region classification system, northern Thailand gains the eight upper-central-region provinces: Kamphaeng Phet, Nakhon Sawan, Phetchabun, Phichit, Phitsanulok, Sukhothai, Uthai Thani and Tak, bringing the total to 17 provinces.

In 2019 it is common to subdivide the northern region into: nine provinces of the upper northern region and eight provinces of the lower northern region. All websites of these eight provinces state: "located in the lower northern region".

Economy
For FY 2018, Northern Thailand Region had a combined economic output of 1,266 trillion baht (US$40.8 billion), or 7.7 percent of Thailand's GDP. Lamphun province had an economic output of 84.395 billion baht (US$2.7 billion). This equates to a GPP per capita of 211,489 baht (US$6,822), half more than for Chiang Mai province, next in the ranking and double than for Lampang province, which is third in the ranking.

Kamphaeng Phet province had an economic output of 117.705 billion baht (US$3.8 billion). This amounts to a GPP per capita of 150,783 baht (US$4,864), half more than for Tak province, which is fifth in the ranking.

Languages

Central Thai is the sole official language in Thailand. However, in the six-region classification system, it is the second largest native language in Northern Thailand, amounting to roughly two hundred thousand people, found in the lower part of Uttaradit Province. Central Thai spoken in southern regions of Northern Thailand in the four-region classification system comprise a group of dialects classified as Ne. Because there are no significant Thai Chinese communities in Northern Thailand, the Krung Thep accent (prestige dialect) is not commonly found in Northern Thailand. 

The main language is Northern Thai, which is a southwestern Tai language spoken in the 9 changwat of Northern Thailand. It is spoken by roughly six million people. There are also various hill tribe languages such as Lolo-Burmese, Karenic, Mienic, Mienic and Palaungic.

Notes
 There was no population survey in 2020 due to COVID-19.

See also
Regional classification of Northern Thailand

References

External links

Regions of Thailand